The Miami Bridge, also known as the McDaniel Memorial Bridge, is a new concrete girder bridge that was built to replace a cantilever through truss bridge over the Missouri River at Miami, Missouri between Saline County, Missouri and Carroll County, Missouri.  The Miami Bridge carries Route 41.  The Miami Bridge was built in 1939, and its deck was replaced in 1983 as part of a rehabilitation project. The old bridge's main cantilever span was 474.7 feet, while the two anchor spans  were each 415 feet in length, resulting in a total cantilever truss length of 1304.7 feet. There were 11 approach spans, including four Warren deck truss spans, three on the northern approach and one on the southern approach. All remaining approach spans were steel stringer (multi-beam/girder) spans. Total bridge length including approach spans is 2,071.9 feet.  The bridge's deck width is 23.0 feet and it has vertical clearance of 16.5 feet.

The bridge was constructed with the assistance of the Federal Administration of Public Works also known as the Public Works Administration. Sverdrup and Parcel were consulting engineers for the structure, and Massman Construction Company was the contractor. The original plans for the bridge show plans for the original wooden toll building that was once located on the bridge. According to the plans, the toll building was painted white, featured wooden Slow and Stop signs, and included a cast iron stove for heating.
 
The Miami Bridge has been listed as eligible for the National Register of Historic Places. According to Clayton B Fraser who conducted Missouri's 1992 Historic Bridge Inventory, the Miami Bridge was eligible for the National Register of Historic Places as an "outstanding, large-scale example of steel truss construction, located on important great river crossing." Despite its historic significance, Missouri Department of Transportation decided against rehabilitating the bridge and instead has decided to demolish the bridge's superstructure and erect a new bridge using the piers and abutment of the old bridge. The project will begin with the bridge's closure, scheduled for October 5, 2009.

See also
List of crossings of the Missouri River

References
Bridgehunter.com profile
Historicbridges.org Narrative and photos

Buildings and structures in Saline County, Missouri
Buildings and structures in Carroll County, Missouri
Bridges completed in 1939
Road bridges in Missouri
Former toll bridges in Missouri
Concrete bridges in the United States
Cantilever bridges in the United States
Girder bridges in the United States